The Oral Roberts–Tulsa basketball rivalry is a college basketball rivalry game between cross-town rivals, the Tulsa Golden Hurricane and the Oral Roberts Golden Eagles. The two teams first played each other in 1974 and as of 2021 have played a total of 117 games. After the rivalry resumed in 2012, it was branded "PSO Mayor’s Cup" with Public Service Company of Oklahoma (PSO) as its corporate sponsor.

History
Tulsa University (TU) and Oral Roberts University (ORU) had their first meeting on March 4, 1974, which Tulsa won 85–84. The series has been hard fought since then, and TU holds the edge in the overall series 36–21. The rivalry has been marked by remarkable runs either way: Oral Roberts won 8 consecutive match-ups in the late 1970s; directly following that streak, TU won the next 13 in a row and 24 of 27 between December 8, 1980 and December 19, 2002. The rivalry has become more balanced this century, with TU leading a 9-8 edge over the past 17 meetings. The largest margin of victory was 45 points, by TU over ORU in 1994. Another turning point in the rivalry was TU's hiring of Bill Self away from ORU prior to the 1997–98 season.

The Tulsa and Oral Roberts Women's basketball teams have faced off in the series since 1976. The ORU Women's team has dominated, 30–7, including a 20-game streak from 1976 through 1999.

The cross-town basketball series has been called the "PSO Mayor’s Cup" since 2012, with Public Service Company of Oklahoma (PSO) serving as the title sponsor.

The 2014 PSO Mayor's Cup Men's game, held on November 15 at Oral Roberts' Mabee Center, was won by ORU by a score of 77–68, serving as the second straight win in the series by the Golden Eagles.  The 2014 PSO Mayor's Cup Women's game, held on November 21, was also won by ORU by a score of 73–71.

Oral Roberts swept the PSO Mayor's Cup games again in 2015, this time at Tulsa's Reynolds Center, with the Golden Eagle women winning 59–53 on November 20, and the ORU men taking their third in a row in the series, 70–68 on December 5.

The series has seen three interruptions in its history:  four seasons spanning 1987 to 1991 when Oral Roberts dropped to NAIA status; in 2010-11 when Tulsa would not agree to a date for the contracted game at ORU's Mabee Center, and 2020-21 when TU opted out of games at Arkansas and ORU due to COVID issues in the program.

Men's Game Results

References

College basketball rivalries in the United States
Tulsa Golden Hurricane basketball
Oral Roberts Golden Eagles men's basketball
Tulsa Golden Hurricane men's basketball
Basketball in Tulsa, Oklahoma